Hierotheus II served as Greek Orthodox Patriarch of Alexandria between 1847 and 1858. He was born in Sifnos.

References

19th-century Greek Patriarchs of Alexandria
People from Sifnos
Greek expatriate bishops